Concepcion "Connie" S.A. Macatuno is a Filipino film and television director, producer, screenwriter and artist.

Filmography

Film

Television

References

External links

Filipino women film directors
Filipino film producers
Filipino screenwriters
Living people
Year of birth missing (living people)